Clouzot may refer to:

Henri-Georges Clouzot (1907–1977), French film director, screenwriter and producer
Véra Clouzot (1913–1960), French film actress